Lake Pleasant is a lake located in Clallam County, Washington, United States. The lake is one of the few that are surrounded by private property and is open to fishing all year around. Types of fish at Lake Pleasant are rainbow trout, kokanee, catfish. Salmon spawn in the lake each year. Water activities such as swimming, jet skiing, water skiing are also allowed on the lake year round.  The lake is located near the town of Beaver, Washington Between milepost 200 and 202 on U.S. Route 101.

Pleasant
Pleasant
Tourist attractions in Clallam County, Washington